Spalacopsis texana is a species of beetle in the family Cerambycidae. It was described by Casey in 1891.

References

Spalacopsis
Beetles described in 1891